Kudara-Somon (Khüderi Homon) is a rural locality (a selo) in Kyakhtinsky District, Republic of Buryatia, Russia. The population was 1,371 as of 2010. There are 21 streets.

Geography 
Kudara-Somon is located 90 km southeast of Kyakhta (the district's administrative centre) by road. Ara Altsagat is the nearest rural locality.

References 

Rural localities in Kyakhtinsky District